Entiat Glacier is in Wenatchee National Forest in the U.S. state of Washington, on the northeast slopes of Mount Maude. Disconnected at several spots, the Entiat Glacier is in a cirque above the Entiat Valley and is the source of the Entiat River. The southern section of the glacier is the largest.

See also
List of glaciers in the United States

References

Glaciers of the North Cascades
Glaciers of Chelan County, Washington
Glaciers of Washington (state)